CrossVegas, known in 2018 as RenoCross, is a Union Cycliste Internationale (UCI) sanctioned Cyclo-cross race that takes place in Las Vegas on a Wednesday evening in September after the first full day of the Interbike trade show.

History 

CrossVegas started in 2007. The night-time race takes place under the lights in September each year at the Desert Breeze Park, just minutes from the famous Las Vegas Strip.  As the first UCI Cyclocross World Cup race of the season, the race course includes many unique features not found in other cyclocross races, including a "ramp" providing a curved velodrome banking. Other course features include 4 sets of stairs, 1 set of barrier (planks), a sand pit and 2 flyovers.

In addition to the UCI elite men's and women's category races, CrossVegas has a USA Cycling race categories and a Wheelers and Dealers Race for representatives of the cycling industry.

CrossVegas has seen impressive growth since its inaugural race in 2007, and each year attracts an increasingly elite field of U.S. and foreign racers as well as over 10,000 spectators. It has been sponsored by Clif Bar since 2011.  Despite its relatively short history, CrossVegas has quickly ascended to the top of the international cyclocross racing scene and now boasts the accolade of being America's biggest cyclocross race.

Elevation to First World Cup Outside Europe 
In 2015, the UCI designated CrossVegas the first UCI Cyclo-cross World Cup race outside Europe

Winners

References

External links 
 CrossVegas

UCI Cyclo-cross World Cup
Cycling events in the United States
Sports competitions in Las Vegas
Cyclo-cross races